Sébastien Portal (born June 4, 1982 in Auch) is a French professional road bicycle racer. He is the brother of the late racing cyclist and directeur sportif Nicolas Portal.

References

External links 

French male cyclists
1982 births
Living people
People from Auch
Sportspeople from Gers
Cyclists from Occitania (administrative region)